Walenty Musielak (7 February 1913 – 11 April 1977) was a Polish soccer player, who represented HCP Poznań in the 1930s. He was born in Buchwald, German Empire. Musielak made one appearance for the Poland Olympic team, in the football tournament at the 1936 Summer Olympics in Berlin, in the match against Austria on 11 August 1936, which Poland lost 3–1. In 1938 Musielak moved to Skarżysko-Kamienna, to play for the local team Granat Skarżysko-Kamienna.

References

External links

 
 

1913 births
1977 deaths
Polish footballers
Olympic footballers of Poland
Footballers at the 1936 Summer Olympics
People from Polkowice County
Sportspeople from Lower Silesian Voivodeship
Association football forwards